José Antonio Martínez Gil (born 12 February 1993) is a Spanish professional footballer who plays as a central defender for FC Dallas. Besides Spain, he has played in the United States.

Club career
Born in La Palma del Condado, Huelva, Andalusia, Martínez finished his formation with AD Nervión. In 2012 he moved to AD Cerro del Águila, making his senior debut during the campaign, in the regional leagues.

In July 2013, Martínez joined Tercera División side CD Alcalá. On 24 January of the following year, after being an undisputed starter, he signed for Sevilla FC and was initially assigned to the reserves in Segunda División B.

On 27 June 2016, after achieving promotion to Segunda División, Martínez agreed to a contract with another reserve team, FC Barcelona B also in the third division. A first-choice, he contributed with 34 appearances and one goal as his side returned to the second division after a two-year absence.

Martínez made his professional debut on 19 August 2017, starting in a 2–1 away win against Real Valladolid. The following 1 July, he signed a three-year contract with La Liga side SD Eibar, but was loaned to Granada CF in the second division late in the month.

On 10 August 2019, after achieving promotion with the Nazaríes, Martinez's loan was renewed for a further year. He made his debut in the top tier on 1 September, playing the last 14 minutes in a 3–0 away defeat of RCD Espanyol.

On 19 December 2020, it was announced that Martínez would join MLS side FC Dallas ahead of their 2021 season.

Career statistics

Club

References

External links
FC Barcelona official profile

1993 births
Living people
Sportspeople from the Province of Huelva
Spanish footballers
Footballers from Andalusia
Association football defenders
La Liga players
Segunda División players
Segunda División B players
Tercera División players
Divisiones Regionales de Fútbol players
Sevilla Atlético players
FC Barcelona Atlètic players
SD Eibar footballers
Granada CF footballers
FC Dallas players
Expatriate soccer players in the United States
Spanish expatriate footballers
Major League Soccer players